Scott E. Anderson (born April 1, 1964), is an American special effects artist best known for Babe, for which he won an Academy Award.

Oscar history
All of these are in the category of Best Visual Effects.

68th Academy Awards-Babe. Award shared with  John Cox, Charles Gibson, and Neal Scanlan. Won.
70th Academy Awards-Nominated for Starship Troopers. Nomination shared with Alec Gillis, John Richardson and Phil Tippett. Lost to Titanic.
73rd Academy Awards-Nominated for Hollow Man. Nomination shared with Craig Hayes, Stan Parks and Scott Stokdyk, lost to Gladiator.

References

External links

Living people
1964 births
Best Visual Effects Academy Award winners
People from Cortland, New York
Special effects people